"Girl" is the third single from Houston rapper Paul Wall's album The Peoples Champ. It samples the song "Oh Girl" by The Chi-Lites. It peaked at number 35 on Billboard Hot 100, making it his highest-charting solo single to date. The video of the single also featured comedian Katt Williams and actress Meagan Good.

Commercial performance
"Girl" debuted on the Billboard Hot 100 the week of March 18, 2006 at number 95. It peaked at number 35 the week of May 20, 2006 and held that position for two weeks. It stayed on the charts for sixteen weeks.

Charts

Weekly charts

Year-end charts

Certifications

References

2005 songs
2006 singles
Paul Wall songs
Atlantic Records singles
Songs written by Paul Wall
Songs written by Eugene Record